Durham was an electoral district for the Legislative Assembly in the Australian state of New South Wales, named after Durham County, which lies on the north side of the Hunter River. From 1856 to 1859, it elected three members simultaneously by voters casting three votes with the three leading candidates being elected. It was abolished in 1859 with the county being split between the districts of Hunter, Lower Hunter, Upper Hunter, Morpeth, Paterson, Patrick's Plains and Williams.

It was recreated in 1880, replacing parts of Paterson and Williams, as a single-member electorate. It was abolished in 1920.

Members for Durham

Election results

Notes

References

Former electoral districts of New South Wales
1856 establishments in Australia
Constituencies established in 1856
1859 disestablishments in Australia
Constituencies disestablished in 1859
1880 establishments in Australia
Constituencies established in 1880
1920 disestablishments in Australia
Constituencies disestablished in 1920